Yamaneko may refer to:

 Yamaneko Group of Comet Observers (YGCO), a group of astronomical observers based in Japan 
 YGCO Chiyoda Station, an astronomical observatory based in Chiyoda, Gunma, Japan, maintained by the YGCO
 23644 Yamaneko, a minor planet in direct orbit around the Sun; named for the YGCO
 Tropical Storm Yamaneko, a weak storm in the 2022 Pacific typhoon season
 Iriomote cat, called  in Japanese